When a Monster is Born is a children's book written by Sean Taylor and illustrated by Nick Sharratt, published in 2006. It won the Nestlé Children's Book Prize Gold Award and was nominated for the Kate Greenaway Medal.

References

2006 children's books
British picture books
British children's books
Orchard Books books